Trychosis ingrata is an insect that belongs to the order Hymenoptera and the family of ichneumon wasps (Ichneumonidae).  The scientific name of the species was first published and validated by Tschek in 1871.

References

"Fauna Europaea : Taxon Details." Trychosis Ingrata : Taxon Details. Fauna Europaea, 29 Aug. 2013. Web. 03 Mar. 2015.
 fauna-eu.org

Ichneumonidae
Insects described in 1871